"I Got the Feelin'" is a funk song by James Brown. Released as a single in 1968, it reached No. 1 on the R&B chart and #6 on the pop chart. It also appeared on a 1968 album of the same name.

The Jackson 5 auditioned for Motown founder Berry Gordy in 1968 with a filmed performance of "I Got the Feelin'", with the ten-year-old Michael Jackson closely mimicking Brown's vocal style and dance moves.

In 1986, the song was prominently featured in the third-season episode of The Cosby Show entitled "Golden Anniversary", with most of the cast performing a lip-synch routine led by a 16-year-old Malcolm-Jamal Warner.

A version of the song is featured in the musical Fela!

The song has been featured in the films Dead Presidents, Undercover Brother and Another 48 Hrs.

Personnel
 James Brown — lead vocal

with the James Brown Orchestra:
 Waymon Reed - trumpet
 Joe Dupars — trumpet
 Levi Rasbury — trombone
 Alfred "Pee Wee" Ellis — alto saxophone
 Maceo Parker — tenor saxophone
 St. Clair Pinckney — baritone saxophone
 Jimmy Nolen — guitar
 Alphonso "Country" Kellum — guitar
 Bernard Odum — bass
 Clyde Stubblefield — drums

References

External links
 [ Song Review] from Allmusic

James Brown songs
1968 singles
Songs written by James Brown
King Records (United States) singles
1968 songs